Monique Rachelle Robins (born 25 September 1983) is a New Zealand former swimmer, who specialised in sprint freestyle and backstroke events. She represented New Zealand, as the youngest swimmer of the team (aged 16), at the 2000 Summer Olympics, and also formerly played for Takapuna Swim Club under her personal coach and mentor Brett Naylor.

Robins competed only in two swimming events at the 2000 Summer Olympics in Sydney. She achieved FINA B-standards of 56.72 (100 m freestyle) and 1:03.72 (100 m backstroke) from the NZ Olympic Trials in Auckland. On the second day of the Games, Robins placed twenty-sixth in the 100 m backstroke. Swimming in heat three, she held off Ukraine's Nadiya Beshevli to pick up a third seed by 14-hundredths of a second in 1:04.52. Three days later, in the 100 m freestyle, Robins challenged seven other swimmers in heat four, including Finland's 15-year-old Hanna-Maria Seppälä and Egypt's three-time Olympian Rania Elwani. She faded down the stretch on the final to take a sixth seed and thirty-third overall in 57.85, just 1.13 seconds below her entry standard and 1.5 behind leader Elwani.

References

External links

1983 births
Living people
New Zealand female swimmers
Olympic swimmers of New Zealand
Swimmers at the 2000 Summer Olympics
New Zealand female freestyle swimmers
Female backstroke swimmers
Swimmers from Wellington City
20th-century New Zealand women
21st-century New Zealand women